Don Pancho Talero was a comic strip created by Argentinian cartoonist Arturo Lanteri, which centred on the family of a sailor named Don Pancho Talero. It appeared in the magazine El Hogar between 1922 and 1944. Three films were also created based on the character:  (1929),  (1930) and Pancho Talero en Hollywood (1931).

References

Argentine comic strips